Eugene Saint Julien Cox (February 21, 1834 – November 3, 1898) was an American politician and lawyer.

Cox was born in Easton, Pennsylvania, just after his parents returned to the United States, after spending sixteen years in Europe. Cox studied law and was admitted to the Wisconsin bar. Cox practiced law in St. Peter, Minnesota and served as mayor. He served in the Union Army during the American Civil War. Cox served in the Minnesota House of Representatives in 1873 as a Democrat and then served in the Minnesota State Senate in 1874 and 1875. Cox served as a Minnesota district court judge from 1877 to 1882. He died in Los Angeles, California.

Notes

1834 births
1898 deaths
Politicians from Easton, Pennsylvania
People from St. Peter, Minnesota
People of Minnesota in the American Civil War
Wisconsin lawyers
Minnesota state court judges
Mayors of places in Minnesota
Democratic Party members of the Minnesota House of Representatives
Democratic Party Minnesota state senators
19th-century American politicians
19th-century American judges
19th-century American lawyers